In computing, a plug-in (or plugin, add-in, addin, add-on, or addon) is a software component that adds a specific feature to an existing computer program. When a program supports plug-ins, it enables customization.

A theme or skin is a preset package containing additional or changed graphical appearance details, achieved by the use of a graphical user interface (GUI) that can be applied to specific software and websites to suit the purpose, topic, or tastes of different users to customize the look and feel of a piece of computer software or an operating system front-end GUI (and window managers).

Purpose and examples
Applications may support plug-ins to:
 enable third-party developers to extend an application
 support easily adding new features
 reduce the size of an application by not loading unused features
 separate source code from an application because of incompatible software licenses.

Types of applications and why they use plug-ins:

 Digital audio workstations and audio editing software use audio plug-ins to generate, process or analyze sound. Ardour, Audacity, Cubase, FL Studio, Logic Pro X and Pro Tools are examples of such systems.
 Email clients use plug-ins to decrypt and encrypt email. Pretty Good Privacy is an example of such plug-ins.
 Video game console emulators often use plug-ins to modularize the separate subsystems of the devices they seek to emulate.  For example, the PCSX2 emulator makes use of video, audio, optical, etc. plug-ins for those respective components of the PlayStation 2.
 Graphics software use plug-ins to support file formats and process images. A Photoshop plug-in may do this.
 Media players use plug-ins to support file formats and apply filters. foobar2000, GStreamer, Quintessential, VST, Winamp, XMMS are examples of such media players.
 Packet sniffers use plug-ins to decode packet formats. OmniPeek is an example of such packet sniffers.
 Remote sensing applications use plug-ins to process data from different sensor types; e.g., Opticks.
 Text editors and Integrated development environments use plug-ins to support programming languages or enhance the development process  e.g., Visual Studio, RAD Studio, Eclipse, IntelliJ IDEA, jEdit and MonoDevelop support plug-ins. Visual Studio itself can be plugged into other applications via Visual Studio Tools for Office and Visual Studio Tools for Applications.
 Web browsers have historically used executables as plug-ins, though they are now mostly deprecated. Examples include the Adobe Flash Player, a Java virtual machine (for Java applets), QuickTime, Microsoft Silverlight and the Unity Web Player. (Browser extensions, which are a separate type of installable module, are still widely in use.)

Mechanism

The host application provides services which the plug-in can use, including a way for plug-ins to register themselves with the host application and a protocol for the exchange of data with plug-ins. Plug-ins depend on the services provided by the host application and do not usually work by themselves. Conversely, the host application operates independently of the plug-ins, making it possible for end-users to add and update plug-ins dynamically without needing to make changes to the host application.

Programmers typically implement plug-ins as shared libraries, which get dynamically loaded at run time. HyperCard supported a similar facility, but more commonly included the plug-in code in the HyperCard documents (called stacks) themselves. Thus the HyperCard stack became a self-contained application in its own right, distributable as a single entity that end-users could run without the need for additional installation-steps. Programs may also implement plug-ins by loading a directory of simple script files written in a scripting language like Python or Lua.

Mozilla definition

In Mozilla Foundation definitions, the words "add-on", "extension" and "plug-in" are not synonyms. "Add-on" can refer to anything that extends the functions of a Mozilla application. Extensions comprise a subtype, albeit the most common and the most powerful one. Mozilla applications come with integrated add-on managers that, similar to package managers, install, update and manage extensions. The term, "plug-in", however, strictly refers to NPAPI-based web content renderers. Mozilla deprecated plug-ins for its products. But UXP-based applications, like web browsers Pale Moon and Basilisk, keep supporting (NPAPI) plug-ins.

History
In the mid 1970s, the EDT text editor ran on the Unisys VS/9 operating system using the UNIVAC Series 90 mainframe computer. It allowed a program to be run from the editor which can access the in-memory edit buffer.  The plug-in executable could call the editor to inspect and change the text. The University of Waterloo Fortran compiler used this to allow interactive compilation of Fortran programs.

Early personal computer software with plug-in capability included HyperCard and QuarkXPress on the Apple Macintosh, both released in 1987. In 1988, Silicon Beach Software included plug-in capability in Digital Darkroom and SuperPaint.

See also
 Applet
 Browser extension

References

Application programming interfaces

Technology neologisms